Byaban may refer to:
 Byaban District
 Byaban Rural District